Past and Present ( Passado e o Presente) is a 1972 Portuguese film directed by Manoel de Oliveira.

Cast
 Maria de Saisset as Vanda, a widow
 Manuela de Freitas as Noémia
 Bárbara Vieira as Angélica
 Alberto Inácio as Ricardo
 Pedro Pinheiro as Firmino
 António Machado as Maurício
 Duarte de Almeida as Honório
 José Martinho as Fernando
 Alberto Branco as Doctor
 Guilhermina Pereira as Housemaid

References

External links
 

1972 romantic drama films
1972 films
Films directed by Manoel de Oliveira
Films set in Portugal
Portuguese romantic drama films